Tomi Pekkala is a Finnish ice hockey player who previously played in Finland for the Lahti Pelicans of the SM-liiga.

References

External links 

Living people
Tappara players
Finnish ice hockey forwards
1988 births
People from Rovaniemi
Sportspeople from Lapland (Finland)